Morals is a 1921 American silent drama film directed by William Desmond Taylor and starring May McAvoy, William P. Carleton, and Marian Skinner. It is based on a 1905 novel, The Morals of Marcus Ordeyne by William J. Locke, which was produced as a 1907 Broadway play starring Marie Doro who later made her screen debut in a 1915 film version.

A British talking version of Locke's story was made in 1935 as The Morals of Marcus.

Plot
A woman escapes the Turkish harem in which she has been brought up and flees to London in the company of a British adventurer.

Cast
 May McAvoy as Carlotta
 William P. Carleton as Sir Marcus Ordeyne
 W.E. Lawrence as Sebastian Pasquale
 Marian Skinner as Mrs McMurray
 Nick De Ruiz as Hamdi
 Starke Patteson as Harry
 Kathlyn Williams as Judith Mainwaring
 Bridgetta Clark as Antoinette
 Sidney Bracey as Stinson

Preservation status
This film is preserved in the collection of the Library of Congress.

References

External links

1921 films
American silent feature films
1920s English-language films
Films directed by William Desmond Taylor
Films based on British novels
Silent American drama films
American black-and-white films
1921 drama films
Remakes of American films
1920s American films